Henry Cobb may refer to:

 Henry Peyton Cobb (1835–1910), English banker, solicitor and Liberal politician
 Henry Ives Cobb (1859–1931), American architect
 Henry Ives Cobb Jr. (1883–1974), American artist and architect, son of Henry Ives Cobb
 Henry H. Cobb (1920–2013), U.S. Army major general
 Henry N. Cobb (1926–2020), American architect